The alcohol licensing laws of the United Kingdom regulate the sale and consumption of alcohol, with separate legislation for England, Wales, Northern Ireland and Scotland being passed, as necessary, by the UK parliament, the Senedd in Wales, the Northern Ireland Assembly, and the Scottish Parliament respectively.

Throughout the United Kingdom, the sale of alcohol is restricted—pubs, restaurants, shops and other premises must be licensed by the local authority. In England, Wales and Scotland the authority to sell alcohol is divided into two parts – the Premises Licence, which prescribes the times and conditions under which alcohol can be sold, and a Personal Licence which allows individuals to sell alcohol or authorise its sale by others. Every Premises Licence which authorises the sale of alcohol must also name a Designated Premises Supervisor (Designated Premises Manager in Scotland) ("DPS" or "DPM" for short) who must hold a valid Personal Licence – otherwise alcohol cannot be sold at those premises. The DPS has day-to-day responsibility for the sale of alcohol at licensed premises. Premises licences, in as far as they concern the sale of alcohol, can be categorised to include on-licences (allowing consumption of alcohol on the premises) and off-licences. However, these distinctions are not explicitly made in the Licensing Act 2003, and the position in Scotland and Northern Ireland is more complex. Many on-licensed premises also permit off-sales.

The minimum age at which people are legally allowed to purchase alcohol is 18. Adults purchasing alcohol on behalf of a person under 18 in a pub or from an off-licence are potentially liable to prosecution along with the vendor.

However, legislation does allow for the consumption of alcohol by those under 18 in the following circumstances:

 The individual is aged 5 or older, and is at home or other private premises - except in Scotland, where there is no longer a minimum age for alcohol consumption.
 The individual is aged 16 or 17 and the alcohol, which can only be beer, wine or cider, is consumed with a table meal.

The person making the purchase must themselves be at least 18 years old.

The Licensing Act 2003 thoroughly revised and consolidated into one Act all the many separate legislative provisions that previously covered licensed premises in England and Wales. The Licensing (Scotland) Act 2005 brought the same reforms to Scotland.

The same reforms have been proposed for Northern Ireland, but have not been enacted; sale of alcohol there remains more strictly regulated than in Great Britain.

History

In the mid-18th century, gin became extremely popular as it was much cheaper to buy than beer. This was known as the 'gin epidemic'. By 1740, six times more gin than beer was being produced, and of the 15,000 drinking establishments in London, half were gin-shops. The Gin Act 1736 imposed a prohibitively high duty on gin, but this caused rioting, and so the duty was gradually reduced and then abolished in 1742. The Gin Act 1751 was more successful: instead of a tax it restricted gin producers to selling only to licensed premises.

During the 19th century, licensing laws began to restrict the opening hours of premises. The Sunday Closing (Wales) Act 1881 required the closure of all public houses in Wales on Sundays.

After the outbreak of World War I the Defence of the Realm Act was passed by Parliament in 1914. One section of the Act concerned the hours pubs could sell alcohol, as it was believed that alcohol consumption would interfere with the war effort. It restricted opening hours for licensed premises to luncheon (11:00 or 12:00 to 14:40 or 15:00, depending on the region) and supper (17:30 or 18:30 to 22:30). Following relaxation in Scotland in 1977, on 21 August, 1988 the licensing laws in England and Wales became less restricted and allowed pubs to allow the consumption of alcohol on the premises from 11:00 until 23:00, although nightclubs were allowed to stay open much later. Significantly revised rules were introduced in November 2005, when hour limits were scrapped, and pubs were allowed to apply for licences as permissive as "24 hours a day". In practice, most pubs chose not to apply for licences past midnight.

Traditionally, the phrase "Last orders!" is still often used to announce the last opportunity to purchase drinks, typically ten or fifteen minutes in advance and is often announced via a bell. At the point when the bar will no longer serve drinks, the bar staff will announce "Time Please!" (Traditionally "Time, gentlemen, please!"), again, either shouted or by use of a bell.

The wartime restrictions in Scotland were not repealed until 1976. As a result, Scottish laws were generally less restrictive, with local authorities being allowed to determine opening hours. Most Scottish pubs now open until midnight, though this is not universal.

On-licence

On-licence describes an establishment where alcohol must be consumed at the point of sale, such as a pub, bar, nightclub or café.

The name derives from the distinction between types of licence which could be granted—a distinction now repealed in England and Wales, and repealed in Scotland in 2009. In England and Wales, the magistrates would formerly grant either an "off" licence permitting the sale of intoxicating liquor for consumption only off the premises, or an "on" licence permitting sale for consumption on the premises—which permitted, to a limited extent, off sales too: many public houses were permitted off sales, to sell sealed alcoholic drinks (e.g., unopened bottles of wine) for consumption elsewhere.  A restaurant licence was an on-licence with a restaurant condition attached.  Until 2009, in Scotland the types of licence were Hotel, Public House, Restricted Hotel, Restaurant, Entertainment, Off-Sale, and Refreshment licences.  In Northern Ireland, there are numerous types of licence.

Under the Licensing Act 2003 and the Licensing (Scotland) Act 2005, there is only one type of premises licence, though the conditions placed on each one will determine whether on sales or off sales (or both) are permitted.

The premises licence is granted to a person, and not to the establishment. Before the Licensing Act 2003 came into effect, there was a legal requirement to display the name of the licensee above the entrance to an on-licence location. The sign would typically say "NAME OF LANDLORD licensed for the sale of alcoholic beverages for consumption on the premises".  Under the 2003 Act, that requirement has been repealed (though such signs are still often seen).  Instead, the premises licence holder must ensure that the official summary of the licence (or a certified copy) is prominently displayed at the premises, as well as the name and position of any person nominated as the custodian of the summary premises licence.

Off-licence

Off-licence (sometimes known as off-sales or informally offie) is a term used in the United Kingdom and Ireland for a shop licensed to sell alcoholic beverages for consumption off the premises, as opposed to a bar or public house which is licensed for consumption at the point of sale (on-licence). The term also applies to the licence granted to the establishment itself.

Off-licences typically are specialist shops, convenience stores, parts of supermarkets, or attached to bars and pubs. Prices are usually substantially lower than in bars or pubs.

In the United Kingdom, the "off-licence" status of a shop could once be used as a device to circumvent restrictive trading laws, particularly those concerning Sunday trading. Depending on local by-laws, shops might be either required to close at 12:00 once a week, or else not be allowed to trade in the evening. Shops with an off-licence made their hours similar to those of public houses, opening during lunch hours and from early evening to the mandatory closing time, usually 22:30 or 23:00. The Sunday Trading Act 1994 exempted liquor stores (and any shops that sells alcohol) from its effects. The mandatory closing time for any licensed liquor stores are regulated by Licensing Act 2003 instead.

During the COVID-19 pandemic in the United Kingdom, all pubs closed during the lockdown from 20 March 2020. However, on 25 March, off-licences were added to the list of essential businesses allowed to stay open, also enabling pubs and brewery taprooms with licences to sell beer for home consumption to offer takeaway sales and home deliveries.

Licensing law in Northern Ireland

In Northern Ireland, legislation is more restrictive than in Great Britain—a reaction to social problems at the beginning of the 20th century.  Only a limited number of licences are available for pubs and off-licences; any new pub or off-licence wanting to sell alcohol must wait until an existing one surrenders its licence (known as the surrender principle).

Licences are granted and administered by the courts, not elected local authorities; the courts have no guidance to assist in the practical application of the law.   A new licence is granted by the County Court and will only be granted on the surrender principle, and only if the court is satisfied that the existing number of licensed premises is not already adequate (the need principle).  The transfer of a licence is a matter for the magistrates' courts.

There are currently twelve categories of premises that may be licensed to sell alcohol, amongst which are pubs, off-licences, and certain businesses where the sale of alcohol is necessary to the main business.

Licensing law in Scotland
Scotland has had separate licensing laws dating back to the eighteenth century. The current legislation is the Licensing (Scotland) Act 2005, which replaced the Licensing (Scotland) Act 1976 on 1 September 2009. The replaced licensing laws provided for seven types of liquor licence, and were administered by licensing boards, made up of councillors elected to the local authority. There were approximately 30 licensing boards in Scotland and each had its own distinct approach; for example, whilst there is a set "permitted hours" across Scotland, these were frequently extended in order to take account of early morning and late night trading, and each licensing board had its own views on what sort of extra hours a premises should be given.

As of 1 February 2008, Scotland entered a "transitional period" in the run-up to the commencement of new licensing legislation—the Licensing (Scotland) Act 2005. The 2005 Act is, in many respects, similar to the English Licensing Act 2003: it features the four English licensing objectives, but adds another: "protecting and improving public health". The Act creates one class of licence—the premises licence—and also introduces personal licences for those working in the trade. The administration continues to be carried out by licensing boards, but the Act has created new "Licensing Forums" in order to increase community involvement, and "Licensing Standards Officers" who have an information, mediation, and compliance role.

The legislation in Scotland regarding the sale of alcohol is different from the rest of the UK and England in particular. The Alcohol etc. (Scotland) Act 2010 has amended the core hours during which shops and supermarkets can sell alcohol. Scotland currently only allows the purchase of alcohol between the hours of 10:00 and 22:00.
 
One major change is that Sunday opening hours can be changed to match the rest of the UK, allowing sales from 10:00, rather than 12:30 with the 1976 Act.

Changes since 2005

On 10 July 2003 the Licensing Act 2003 was granted Royal Assent and replaced the previous licensing laws for England and Wales, regulated under several different Acts, with a single unified system covering a range of "regulated activities". Rules as to when establishments can open, for how long, and under what criteria are now not laid down in statute but are individual to the premises and are contained in the conditions on each premises licence. The powers of the 2003 Act came fully into force on 24 November 2005.

Permitted hours
Some long-standing traditions (indeed, legal requirements) have disappeared as a consequence. First, "permitted hours" gained a new meaning. Until the 2003 Act came into force on 24 November 2005, permitted hours were a standard legal constraint: for example, serving alcohol after 23:00 meant that a licensing extension had to exist—either permanent (as for nightclubs, for example), or by special application from the licensee concerned for a particular occasion. There was also a customary general derogation permitting a modest extension on particular dates, such as New Year's Eve and some other Public Holidays. Licensees did not need to apply for these and could take advantage of them if they wished without any formality. Now, permitted hours are theoretically continuous: it is possible for a premises licence to be held which allows 24-hour opening, and indeed some do exist.

Most licensed premises do not go this far, but many applied for licences in 2005 that allowed them longer opening hours than before. However, as in the past, there is no obligation for licensees to use all the time permitted to them. Premises that still close (for commercial reasons) at 23:00 during most of the week may well have licences permitting them to remain open longer, perhaps for several hours. Staying open after 23:00 on the spur of the moment is therefore legal at such premises if the licensee decides to do so. The service of alcohol must still cease when the licence closing time arrives. Only the holder of the comparatively rare true "24-hour" licence has complete freedom in this respect.

Drinking-up time

The consumption of alcohol itself is not considered a "licensable activity" under the new Licensing Act. Therefore, "drinking-up time" (DUT) has no legal meaning and has disappeared. For many years ten minutes (and later extended to twenty minutes) was the legal dispensation which allowed the consumption of alcohol to continue after the official closing time, which in recent times meant that customers could still drink what they had already bought until 23:20, subject to the licensee's discretion. After that time consumption had to also stop.

With the end of standard permitted hours, this concession became irrelevant and there is no mention of DUT in the 2003 Act. Instead, applicants for premises licences can specify the maximum period (their "Opening Hours") for which they wish to allow their customers to stay after the time at which the sale of alcohol ends ("the terminal hour") within their Operating Schedule. Some licences do not specify opening hours at all, which allows an unspecified drinking up time, determined only by the licensee's discretion. In contrast, some licensees call for "last orders" twenty minutes (or more) before the end of the opening hours specified on their premises' licence.

Scotland
Licensing law in Scotland was overhauled by the Licensing (Scotland) Act 2005, which came into force in September 2009 following a transition period starting in February 2008. The new system covers alcohol sales only, but otherwise is, in most particulars, identical to the system created in England and Wales by the Licensing Act 2003. There are a number of significant differences, such as a "duty to trade" and attempts to control the irresponsible sale of alcohol through curbs on price discounting and other promotions which may lead to excessive consumption. Another law, starting from 1 May 2018, states that alcohol cannot be sold for under 50p per unit.

Northern Ireland
Licensing proposals in Northern Ireland were first announced by the Northern Ireland Office in 2004, leading to a consultation in 2005, again very similar to the Scottish and English Acts.  The proposals triggered much initial opposition, even from some parts of the licensed trade. These proposals are not currently proceeding.

Under the proposed rules, all premises where regulated activities are carried out must be authorised by a premises licence.  Where alcohol is sold the premises must have a designated premises supervisor, who themselves must hold a personal licence.  There is a parallel system for the registration of private clubs which sell alcohol to members, and which require a club registration certificate.

Serving after 23:00
Part of the changes since 2005 allow pubs to serve alcohol past 23:00; this particular part of the legislation was, and remains, very controversial due to the perceived increase in potential for binge drinking and the effects the change will have on social dynamics. However, the new law's defenders have claimed that the relatively early 23:00 closing time itself contributed to binge drinking, as patrons hurried to drink before closing time. Labour also claimed that the fixed closing time contributed to social disorder, as drunken pub patrons were forced into the street at the same time. Both the Conservative Party and Liberal Democrats unsuccessfully called for a delay in the implementation of this law.

Licensing policies

Each licensing authority must adopt a licensing policy, which gives guidance on when licences will be granted and the conditions and permitted hours likely to be imposed on a premises licence in various circumstances.

Licensable activities (England and Wales)

The Licensing Act 2003 defines "licensable activities" as:

 the retail sale of alcohol,
 the supply of alcohol in clubs,
 the provision of late night refreshment, and
 the provision of regulated entertainment

In turn, "regulated entertainment" is defined as:

 a performance of a play,
 an exhibition of a film,
 an indoor sporting event,
 a boxing or wrestling entertainment (both indoors and outdoors),
 a performance of live music,
 any playing of recorded music, or
 a performance of dance
 entertainment of a similar description to that falling in the previous three categories listed above.

There are many exemption categories and qualifications to the above definitions, particularly in respect of Regulated Entertainment and Late Night Refreshment.  As a result of changes by the Live Music Act 2012, for example, live music in on-licensed premises is no longer a licensable activity between 08:00 and 23:00 hours before audiences of up to 200 people.  Similarly performances of plays and of dance are not licensable before audiences of up to 500 people and indoor sporting events up to 1000 people.  These changes, brought in from 2013, coupled with the Live Music Act in 2012, display a readiness by the Coalition Government to deregulate the prescriptive and sometimes confusing definitions of Regulated Entertainment stated above (although the Live Music Act was a Private Members' Bill sponsored by Lord Clement-Jones and drafted by Poppleston Allen Solicitors which was subsequently supported by the Government).

"Late night refreshment" is defined as:

 the supply of hot food or drink (that is, food or drink that is either served at, or has been heated on the premises to, a point above ambient temperature) to the public for consumption, both on or off the premises, between 23:00 and 05:00.

Licensing objectives
The licensing authority, in considering any application for a licence or for a variation must have regard to "the licensing objectives":

Licensing authorities
The licensing authorities are local councils.  In two-tier parts of England and Wales, these are the district or borough councils and elsewhere the unitary authority is the licensing authority.  In Scotland each council has a Licensing Board to act as licensing authority.

For a premises licence, the licensing authority is the council for the place where the premises are located; where they straddle a boundary, the applicant may choose either one.  For a personal licence, it is the licensing authority in whose area the applicant lives.

The Licensing Authority is also responsible for the issue of a Personal Licence.

Personal Licence
The Personal Licence allows an individual to sell alcohol or authorise its sale by others. A Personal Licence applicant must, prior to making an application, pass an exam, known as the Award for Personal Licence Holders (APLH) The APLH exam is a 40-question, multiple-choice paper, in which the applicant must achieve a score of 28 out of 40, or 70 percent. The applicant must also obtain "Basic Disclosure" which details any unspent convictions.

Upon application and if the applicant has no unspent relevant convictions the licensing authority must grant a Personal Licence, now with no expiry date attached. If relevant convictions are disclosed then the Licensing Authority must send a copy of the application to the local Police, who can object within 14 days. A hearing may then follow.

The applicant must make their application to the licensing authority where they ordinarily reside. Any changes to the Personal Licence thereafter (for example, name or address) must be notified to that original licensing authority, even if the Personal Licence Holder ("PLH") has subsequently moved out of the area. Failure to do so is a criminal offence.

A PLH, if charged with a relevant criminal offence, must tell the court at the first appearance that they are a Holder of a Personal Licence. Failure to do so is a criminal offence. If the PLH is convicted of the original offence the Court can suspend or forfeit the personal licence.
A Personal Licence is valid:

 In England and Wales, indefinitely. The act originally required a holder to renew their personal licence every 10 years. Due to the vast number of licences first issued under the new regime in 2005, and the burden it would have on Licensing Authorities, the Government made all personal licences run indefinitely by enactment of section 69 of the Deregulation Act 2015.
In Scotland, also 10 years but after 5 years the licence holder must satisfy the local licensing board that they have passed a refresher course.
In Northern Ireland, also 10 years and under substantially stricter conditions as the Licensing Authorities in England, Wales, and Scotland. A Personal Licence granted in one jurisdiction is not valid in another.

A Designated Premises Supervisor (DPS), who is listed on a premises licence and responsible for the day to day running of the premises, is required to be a Personal Licence Holder where the retail sale of alcohol is a permitted activity on the licence.

Local variations
Local authorities have decided whether or not on a local basis to exercise their power to introduce specific restrictions on outdoor drinking.  For example, Reading Borough Council is among authorities to have emulated the conditions of Transport for London that ban drinking in certain locations and the carrying of open alcohol in parts of Reading town centre. The open alcohol container ban and ban on alcohol consumption outright sets a lower threshold than being drunk or drunk and disorderly in a public place.

Concerns
While the reforms from 2005 were intended to reduce "binge drinking", reports have variously claimed that the situation in England and Wales has not improved, or that it has become even worse.  This has prompted a Parliamentary investigation. The Department of Culture, Media and Sport concludes that the position presents "a mixed picture".

Perceived problems in England and Wales shaped a slightly different approach in the Licensing (Scotland) Act 2005.

Most licensed premises are now following the Challenge 21 rule, which helps with avoiding selling to under age people. When a shop assistant believes that the person may be under 21, then they will ask the customer to prove that they are over 18. Challenge 25 (or older) was made mandatory in Scotland by the Alcohol etc. (Scotland) Act 2010.

See also
Temperance (Scotland) Act 1913
Prohibition (Laws in different countries)
 List of public house topics
 Alcohol licensing laws of Ireland

References

External links
BBC News: 'No demand' for all-day drinking
The Observer: Police fear chaos over pub hours
Proposed changes to Scottish Licensing laws
Scottish Licensing Law Journal
Database of 24 Hour Off Licences
Transcripts of British licensing laws 1552-1904

UK Legislation
 

Alcohol law in the United Kingdom
Pubs in the United Kingdom
Drinking culture